Holtbyrnia is a genus of tubeshoulders.

Species
There are currently nine recognized species in this genus:
 Holtbyrnia anomala G. Krefft, 1980 (Bighead searsid)
 Holtbyrnia conocephala Sazonov, 1976
 Holtbyrnia cyanocephala (G. Krefft, 1967)
 Holtbyrnia innesi (Fowler, 1934) (Teardrop tubeshoulder)
 Holtbyrnia intermedia (Sazonov, 1976)
 Holtbyrnia laticauda Sazonov, 1976 (Tusked tubeshoulder)
 Holtbyrnia latifrons Sazonov, 1976 (Streaklight tubeshoulder)
 Holtbyrnia macrops Maul, 1957 (Bigeye searsid)
 Holtbyrnia ophiocephala Sazonov & Golovan, 1976

References

Platytroctidae
Ray-finned fish genera